Morskoy is a rural locality (a khutor) in Tormosinovskoye Rural Settlement, Chernyshkovsky District, Volgograd Oblast, Russia. The population was 287 as of 2010.

Geography 
Morskoy is located in southwest of Vologda Oblast, 68 km southeast of Chernyshkovsky (the district's administrative centre) by road. Loznoy is the nearest rural locality.

References 

Rural localities in Chernyshkovsky District